"A Drug Against War" is a song by industrial rock band KMFDM, taken from their 1993 album Angst. It was released as a single prior to the album. A music video, featuring animated depictions of the band's previous album covers and singles, was made for the single, and was subsequently shown on the MTV cartoon Beavis and Butt-head on July 11, 1994. It was re-released as a 7" in 2009. On December 16, 2010, it was made available as a downloadable song for the game Rock Band. In late 2011, the band released a new version of the song called "A Drug Against Wall Street", with lyrics in support of the Occupy Wall Street movement, and made it available for free download from their site.

Song 
The song includes several militaristic samples.  The primary one, in which someone calls for the bombing of enemy troops, comes from a live news broadcast about the Gulf War that Konietzko taped.  The lyrics mix social criticism with regular reference to war, and the instruments simulate the sounds of missiles and gunfire.  Eventually, the martial symbolism becomes so overt and over-the-top that academic S. Alexander Reed identifies this as a sign that it is meant satirically.  Reed compares these militaristic themes to the "war on drugs", which is ironically referenced in the song's title and turned into an anti-war motto.  According to Reed, the song's ironic use of militarism marks it as yet another social ill to be criticized.

Critical reception
Andy Hinds, in the 2002 book All Music Guide to Rock, called the song KMFDM's most over the top moment to date. Ten years after its release, Brad Filicky of CMJ New Music Report said "A Drug Against War" was one of the most potent speed metal songs ever. Joshua Landau of Allmusic said that while the song was "one of the best introductions to KMFDM's antagonistic guitars and viewpoints", the four track single was "only of interest to serious fans".

"A Drug Against War" was ranked No. 47 on COMA Music Magazine's 101 Greatest Industrial Songs of All Time.

Track listing

1993 release

2009 7" reissue

Personnel
Sascha Konietzko – vocals (1-4), programming (1-4), drum sequences and arrangement (3, 4), production
En Esch – drum sequences and arrangement (1, 2)
Mark Durante – guitars (1-3)
Svet Am – guitars (1-4)
Christine Siewert – backing vocals (4)

References

1993 singles
KMFDM songs
TVT Records singles
1993 songs
Speed metal songs
Wax Trax! Records singles
Songs written by Sascha Konietzko
Songs written by Günter Schulz
Songs written by En Esch
Songs written by Chris Shepard